Mark Charles Albert Pougatch (born 27 January 1968) is an English radio and television broadcaster, a journalist and author who is currently the Chief Sport Presenter for ITV Sport, fronting their major football and rugby coverage. He is also the sideline reporter for Stan Sport's UEFA competition coverage. Pougatch was the presenter of BT Sport Score.

Early life
Born in Paddington, west London, Pougatch attended Malvern College, where he was captain of the First XI cricket team and graduated with a degree in politics at the University of Durham where he was a member of Hatfield College. He then undertook a postgraduate diploma in Broadcast Journalism at the London College of Communication.

Broadcasting career
Pougatch initially worked for six months at the former BBC radio station for London, BBC GLR. He then became a regular football reporter in 1992 with BBC Essex.

In 1994, he joined BBC Radio 5 Live, selected to be the main presenter of 5 live Sport on Sundays. In August 2000, he switched to the flagship Saturday edition of the show and continued to present this until August 2016 when he was replaced by Mark Chapman. Pougatch continues to present some other editions of 5 Live Sport, most notably on Tuesday and Wednesday evenings throughout the football season. He also presents The Weekend Review on Premier League TV on Monday throughout the Football season.

Pougatch has presented coverage of the IPL cricket and the African Cup of Nations for ITV.

In January 2015, Pougatch replaced Adrian Chiles as the main football presenter on ITV, fronting the channel's coverage of the UEFA Champions League, England Internationals and later Euro 2016. In February and March 2016, Pougatch co-presented ITV's coverage of the Six Nations Rugby Championship, and continued in this role in 2017, 2018 and 2019, subsequently co-hosting ITV's coverage of the 2019 Rugby World Cup alongside (amongst others) Craig Doyle.

In March 2012, he won the Sports Journalists' Association award for Sports Broadcaster of the Year.

Since 13 August 2016, Pougatch has presented the Saturday afternoon show BT Sport Score on BT Sport.

Pougatch join Australia's Stan Sport's coverage of UEFA Champions League, Europa League, Conference League and Super Cup, reporting live from the stadium.

Other activities
Pougatch joined the team of Football Superstars, a game which was due to be released in 2009 as an innovative MMORPG game integrating gameplay with footballers' lifestyles. He is the author of Three Lions Versus the World: England's World Cup Stories from the Men Who Were There. He is also a speaker, after dinner and at daytime events.

Personal life
Pougatch is married to Lady Victoria Scott, the younger daughter of the 5th Earl of Eldon. They live in Oxfordshire with their three children. His grandfather was among the Jewish diaspora who escaped Ukraine amid the violence that followed the first Russian Revolution.

References

External links

The Official Football Superstars Website
Mark Pougatch on Twitter
5 Live Sport

1968 births
BBC newsreaders and journalists
BBC Radio 5 Live presenters
BT Sport presenters and reporters
English association football commentators
English people of Ukrainian-Jewish descent
Living people
People from Paddington
People educated at Malvern College
Tennis commentators
Golf writers and broadcasters
Alumni of Hatfield College, Durham